Paine (Payne) Page Prim (May 2, 1822 – August 8, 1899) was an American attorney and judge in the state of Oregon. He was the 6th Chief Justice of the Oregon Supreme Court serving in that role from three times between 1864 and 1878. Prim served on Oregon’s highest court for 21 years. Prim was the first graduate of Cumberland University's law school, and a participant at the Oregon Constitutional Convention.

Early life
On May 2, 1822, Paine P. Prim was born in Wilson County, Tennessee. He grew up on his father’s farm before enrolling at Cumberland University in Lebanon, Tennessee. Prim received his legal education and was the school's first law graduate. Then in 1851 he traveled to Oregon via the Oregon Trail. There he settled in Linn County where he set up a law practice. Next, in 1857 he represented Jackson County at Oregon’s constitutional convention.

Judicial career
In 1859, Prim was appointed to the Oregon Supreme Court by Governor John Whiteaker to fill the seat of Matthew P. Deady who had resigned. Then in 1860 he was elected to a full six-year term on the bench. Prim won re-election in 1866, and 1872. He term then ended in 1878, but was appointed on a temporary basis and served until 1880. While on the court he was chief justice three times: 1864 to 1866, 1870 to 1872, and 1876 to 1878.

Later life
Prior to serving on the bench, Prim married Teresa M. Stearns in 1857. The couple produced three children. In 1880, after his term on the court ended, Prim returned to private practice in Jacksonville, Oregon. Then in 1882 he returned to politics when he was elected to the Oregon State Senate as a Democrat from Jackson County. He served again at the next session in 1885 in both the regular and special sessions that year. Paine Page Prim then died in Oakland, California, on August 8, 1899, at the age of 77 and is buried in Jacksonville, Oregon.

In 1961, the actor Arthur Franz was cast as Prim in the episode, "Justice at Jackson Creek", on the syndicated television anthology series, Death Valley Days, hosted by Stanley Andrews. Prim is shown as a drunken, ostracized lawyer who hesitates to help a miner in legal trouble but must overcome his personal demons. The episode also stars Dub Taylor as Jake; William Schallert as Carl Spenger, and Bill Bixby as Kinney.

References

External links
Biographical Sketch of Paine Page Prim at Oregon State Archives

Oregon state senators
People from Wilson County, Tennessee
Cumberland University alumni
Members of the Oregon Constitutional Convention
1822 births
1899 deaths
Oregon pioneers
Chief Justices of the Oregon Supreme Court
People from Jacksonville, Oregon
19th-century American politicians
19th-century American judges
Justices of the Oregon Supreme Court